The Colbrand Baronetcy, of Boreham in the County of Sussex, was a title in the Baronetage of England.  It was created on 21 December 1621 for John Colbrand.  The title became extinct on the death of the fifth Baronet in 1709.

Colbrand baronets, of Boreham (1621)
Sir John Colbrand, 1st Baronet (died 1627)
Sir James Colbrand, 2nd Baronet (died )
Sir Richard Colbrand, 3rd Baronet (died 1664)
Sir Charles Colbrand, 4th Baronet (died 1667)
Sir Robert Colbrand, 5th Baronet (died 1709)

References

Extinct baronetcies in the Baronetage of England
1621 establishments in England